Escape Plans is a novel by Gwyneth Jones published in 1986.

Plot summary
Escape Plans is a novel in which ruling class dilettante Alice descends into a world totally dependent on information systems, and a revolution brews.

Reception
Dave Langford reviewed Escape Plans for White Dwarf #78, and stated that "Jones' welter of neologisms and acronyms is initially overwhelming, and I kept furtively turning to the glossary [...] But it's worth wading through the alphabet soup for the story."

Reviews
Review by Brian Stableford (1986) in Fantasy Review, May 1986
Review by Paul Kincaid (1986) in Vector 132

References

1986 novels